Bad Neighbor is a collaborative studio album by rappers MED and Blu and producer Madlib. It was released on Bang Ya Head on October 30, 2015. It features guest appearances from the likes of MF Doom, Aloe Blacc, Mayer Hawthorne, Jimetta Rose, Dâm-Funk, and Oh No. The album was re-issued in 2021.

Critical reception
At Metacritic, which assigns a weighted average score out of 100 to reviews from mainstream critics, Bad Neighbor received an average score of 81% based on 5 reviews, indicating "universal acclaim".

David Jeffries of AllMusic gave the album 4 stars out of 5, saying, "Bad Neighbor is as if the Ruff Ryders albums were reimagined by this trio and all the avant heads get to party, but it is also worth mentioning that the often slept-on MED and Blu seem to steer this beast as much as the beloved Madlib." Marcus J. Moore of Pitchfork gave the album a 7.2 out of 10, saying, "Bad Neighbor whizzes by in a blunted haze, which might be an insult to another project, but it works well here, when the stakes are low and the mood is most important."

Track listing

Charts

References

External links
 

2015 albums
Collaborative albums
Blu (rapper) albums
Madlib albums